WPLI  (1390 AM) is a commercial radio station licensed to Lynchburg, Virginia.  WPLI simulcasts a sports radio format with WPLY 610 AM in Roanoke.  Both stations are owned and operated by Mel Wheeler, Inc.  Most programming is supplied by Fox Sports Radio.

References

External links
Sports Radio Virginia Online

1988 establishments in Virginia
Sports radio stations in the United States
Radio stations established in 1988
PLI